All This Time is the second album by American blues rock band Heartless Bastards. It is their second Release on Fat Possum Records. It was their last full release to include the original drummer Kevin Vaughn and bassist Mike Lamping, who would both leave before recording The Mountain. It was produced by Brian Niesz and released on August 8, 2006.

Track listing

All tracks written by Erika Wennerstrom.

 "Into the Open" – 4:24
 "Searching for the Ghost" – 3:46
 "Finding Solutions" – 3:34
 "All This Time" – 3:06
 "Brazen" – 3:17
 "I Swallowed a Dragonfly" – 4:05
 "Blue Day" – 4:49
 "Valley of Debris" – 4:18
 "No Pointing Arrows" – 2:39
 "Came a Long Way" – 5:53

Personnel 

 Erika Wennerstrom – vocals, guitar, piano
 Mike Lamping – bass
 Kevin Vaughn – drums

References

2006 albums
Heartless Bastards albums